Dmytro Polyuhanych (born June 2, 1996) is a Ukrainian footballer currently playing with FC Vorkuta in the Canadian Soccer League.

Career  
Polyuhanych played in the Ukrainian Second League with FC Skala Stryi in 2017-18. In 2018, he went abroad in play in the Canadian Soccer League with FC Vorkuta. He primarily featured in the Second Division with FC Vorkuta B, and won the CSL D2 Championship in his debut season. For the 2019 season he played with expansion franchise Kingsman SC. In 2020, he featured in the CSL Championship final with Vorkuta against Scarborough SC and assisted in securing the championship. 

In 2021, he assisted in securing Vorkuta's third regular season title.

Honors 
FC Vorkuta

 CSL Championship: 2020
 CSL II Championship: 2018 
Canadian Soccer League Regular Season: 2021

References  

1996 births
Living people
Ukrainian footballers
FC Skala Stryi (2004) players
FC Continentals players
Canadian Soccer League (1998–present) players
Association football midfielders
Ukrainian Second League players